James Martin McGroarty (born 30 August 1957) is a Northern Irish former footballer who played in the Football League for Stoke City.

Career
McGroarty was born in Derry and played football with Tammaherin Youth Club and Finn Harps before joining English side Stoke City in 1977. He played three times in 1977–78 scoring once against Mansfield Town. In 1978–79 he made six appearances and again scored once this time against Charlton Athletic. At the end of the season he returned to Ireland and went on to play for Sligo Rovers, Finn Harps, Glenavon, Crusaders and Dungiven Celtic. His brother Eddie played alongside him at Finn Harps in the 1970s.

In May 2008 McGroarty was appointed manager of Limavady United.

Career statistics

References

1957 births
Living people
Association footballers from Northern Ireland
Stoke City F.C. players
English Football League players
Finn Harps F.C. players
Sligo Rovers F.C. players
Glenavon F.C. players
Crusaders F.C. players
NIFL Premiership players
Football managers from Northern Ireland
Association football forwards
Limavady United F.C. managers